Mitromorpha salisburyi is a species of sea snail; a marine gastropod mollusk in the family Mitromorphidae.

Description
The length of the ovate-biconic shell varies between 3 mm and 4 mm; its diameter is 2 mm.

Distribution
This marine species occurs off Hawaii and the Tuamotu Islands

References

 Severns, M. (2011). Shells of the Hawaiian Islands - The Sea Shells. Conchbooks, Hackenheim. 564 pp.
 Cernohorsky W.O. (1978) New species of Mitridae, Costellariidae, and Turridae from the Hawaiian Islands with notes in Mitra sphoni in the Galapagos Islands. The Nautilus 92(3): 61–67
 Liu J.Y. [Ruiyu] (ed.). (2008). Checklist of marine biota of China seas. China Science Press. 1267 pp.

External links
 
 

salisburyi
Gastropods described in 1978